Following is a list of films cut over the director's opposition. At times, a movie studio will cut a film, usually to give it a more upbeat ending or to shorten it.

See also 
 Alan Smithee, an official pseudonym used when a director wishes to disassociate themselves from a project

References

Cut over the director's opposition
 List of films cut over the director's opposition